Dance Music Will Tear Us Apart is an EP from New Zealand band Minuit.

Each track of this EP was produced by either 'Funknslocuts' (Ryan Beehre) or 'Gimme A C!' (Paul Dodge), in collaboration with lead singer Ruth Carr. The producer had artistic freedom to do as they wished with the songs they were given.

The EP features remixes of previous Minuit releases, as well as unreleased tracks; "Stop Dancing," and "Suicide Bridge." The track "Of Regrets" is a remix of "We're All Scared Professor," from the album, The Guards Themselves.

Track listing 
 "Stop Dancing" Gimme A C!
 "Out of Luck" Funknslocuts
 "Suicide Bridge" Funknslocuts
 "Queen of the Flies" Gimme A C!
 "Of Regrets" Funknslocuts
 "Aries" Gimme A C!

2010 EPs
Minuit (band) albums